The  is an  or  (painted narrative handscroll) from the second half of the 13th century, in the  period of Japanese history (1185–1333).

Both the author and the sponsor of the work remain unknown, and its production probably spanned several decades. Nowadays, only three original scrolls and a few fragments of a fourth remain; they are held by the Museum of Fine Arts, Boston, the  Art Museum, Tokyo, and the Tokyo National Museum. The civil wars for the domination of Japan at the end of the  period, which ended with the victory of the Minamoto clan in the  War, had a strong effect on the course of history in Japan.

The paintings in the work, in the  style, are distinguished by both the dynamism of lines and movement and the vivid colours, as well as a realistic impetus characteristic of the arts of the Kamakura period. Cruelty, massacres and barbarities are also reproduced without any attenuation. The result is a "new style particularly suited to the vitality and confidence of the Kamakura period". In several scrolls, long painted sequences introduced by short calligraphy passages are carefully composed in such a way as to create the tragic and the epic, such as the passage of the fire at  Palace, deeply studied by art historians.

Background

arts

Originating in Japan in the sixth or seventh century through trade with the Chinese Empire,  art spread widely among the aristocracy in the Heian period. An  consists of one or more long rolls of paper narrating a story through  texts and paintings.

The narrative of an  assumes a series of scenes, the rhythm, composition and transitions of which are entirely the artist's sensitivity and technique. The themes of the stories were very varied: illustrations of novels, historical chronicles, religious texts, biographies of famous people, humorous or fantastic anecdotes, etc.

The  period, the advent of which followed a period of political turmoil and civil wars, was marked by the coming to power of the warrior class (the ). Under the impetus of the new warrior class in power,  evolved towards a more realistic and composite pictorial style.

The  rebellion

During this transition, the authority of the emperors and the  regents weakened due to corruption, the growing independence of local chiefs (s), starvation and even superstition, so that the two main clans of the time vied for control of the state: the  clan and the  clan.

Relations between the two clans deteriorated and political plots were asserted, so much so that in early 1160, the  clan attempted a coup by  besieging  Palace in Kyoto to kidnap Retired Emperor  and his son Emperor . It was the start of the  rebellion. Ironically, among these children spared was  who, a generation later in the  War (1180–1185), would avenge his father and take control of all of Japan, establishing the political domination of the warriors in the new  period, from which the  dates.

The rivalries of clans, wars, personal ambitions and political intrigue amid social change and radical policies have made the  rebellion an epic subject par excellence.

Description

According to Dietrich Seckel, the original version probably had between ten and fifteen chapters, covering the thirty-six chapters of The Tale. Period fragments of a fourth scroll also exist, as well as later copies of a fifth.

The whole scene, cruel and pathetic, is built around the fire, bloody fighting around the palace, and the pursuit and arrest of Retired Emperor . Nobles of the court, including women, were for the most part savagely killed by guns, fire or horses.

Alas, the latter commits suicide in the mountains around Kyoto and his body is found by 's men, who behead him to bring back his head as a trophy. Clan leaders then visit 's home to verify 's death and return to Kyoto showing off his head.

Although the composition of this scroll is very similar to that of the other scrolls, it cannot be said with certainty that all of the fragments belong to the original work, as there are slight stylistic variations.

Several copies of the original four scrolls remain, as well as copies of a fifth, which is entirely lost: the battle of the  Gate, without text, narrating the 's assault on the Imperial Palace where the  warriors had entrenched themselves.

The first scroll, now in Boston, depicting the burning of the  Palace, is regularly described as one of the masterpieces of Japanese  art and of military painting of the world in general.

Dating, author and sponsor

Very little information is available about the realisation of the original scrolls, and the events explaining their condition and partial destruction. The artist(s) remain unknown; the work was previously attributed to the supposed 14th century painter , but that attribution has been deprecated since the second half of the 20th century, as the very existence of that painter is doubtful.

According to estimates and stylistic comparisons, the creation of the work dates from the middle and second half of the 13th century, probably between the 1250s and the 1280s. The pictorial proximity between all the scrolls shows that they probably come from the same workshop painters, but slight variations tend to confirm that the preparation took place over several decades during the second half of the 13th century, without the reason for such a long period of creation being known.

Fragments of the fourth or Battle of  scroll, a little more recent and slightly different in style, may belong either to the original work or to an old copy from the Kamakura period according to art historians, but again the true position is uncertain.

Style and composition

Artists of the  style, a colourful and decorative everyday form of art, expressed in all their subjects the sensitivity and character of the people of the Japanese archipelago.

The dynamism of the lines is particularly evident in the crowds of people and soldiers. The colour in the work is applied mainly using the  technique characteristic of : a first sketch of the outlines is made, then the colour is added in solid form, and finally the outlines are redrawn in ink over the paint. The military in power at the time particularly appreciated colourful and dynamic historical and military chronicles.

The realistic tendency is also found in most of the alternative versions of the work. On the other hand, the sets are most often minimalist to keep the reader's attention on the action and the suspense, without distraction.

The  is also distinguished by two types of classical  arts composition techniques. On the one hand, continuous compositions make it possible to represent several scenes or events in the same painting, without a precise border, in order to favour a fluid pictorial narration; this is the case with the first or  Palace fire scroll and the fourth or Battle of  scroll. On the other hand, the alternating compositions bring together calligraphy and illustrations, the paintings then aiming to capture particular moments of the story; this is the case with the other scrolls as well as the copies of the now lost Battle of  Gate scroll.

The long painted sequences with continuous compositions, sometimes interspersed with short calligraphy, make possible the intensification of the painting to its dramatic climax, in the remarkable scene of the fire at the  Palace: the reader first discovers the flight of the Emperor's troops, then more and more violent fighting leading up to the confusion around the fire – the summit of the composition where the density of the characters only fades in front of the ample volutes of smoke – and then finally the scene calms down with the encirclement of the Emperor's chariot and a soldier who moves away peacefully towards the left. For art historians, the mastery of composition and rhythm, evident in continuous paintings, as well as the care given to colours and lines, make this scroll one of the most admirable to have survived from the  period.

The  also displays some innovations of composition for the groups of characters, by arranging them in triangles or rhombuses. This approach makes it possible to take advantage of the reduced height of the scrolls to represent battles by interweaving geometric shapes according to the needs of the artist.

Historiographical value

The first or  Palace fire scroll shows a wide range of this military class: clan chiefs, horse archers, infantry, monk-soldiers, imperial police ... The beauty of the luxurious harnesses of the  period is also underlined by the work; the contrast between the harnesses and the cruel and vulgar squadron is interesting, in particular because the texts in the work deal very little with this subject. Additionally, some aspects of period military uniforms can only be understood today through the paintings. On the other hand, the texts provide little historiographical information because of their brevity and, sometimes, their inadequate or inaccurate descriptions of the paintings.

The depiction of  Palace shortly before its destruction provides an important example of the ancient  architectural style that developed in the  period away from the Chinese influences in vogue during the  period.

In paintings of a major military subject in Japan, many depictions of battle are unsurprisingly inspired by the work. Indeed, the fourth or Battle of  scroll was the most imitated and popular in Japanese painting, so much so that in the  period it became a classic motif of battle paintings.

Finally,  drew some inspiration from the work for his film Gate of Hell.

Provenance
During the 15th and the 16th centuries, the original scrolls were separated, but their history at that time is lost to modern times. In the 19th century, the Museum of Fine Arts, Boston, won the first or  Palace fire scroll through . The third or Flight to  Scroll was acquired by the Tokyo National Museum from the  clan in around 1926. Finally, the second or  scroll was acquired by the wealthy  family, whose collection is preserved by the  Foundation (now the  Art Museum).

See also
List of National Treasures of Japan (paintings)
National Treasure (Japan)

References

Notes

Bibliography

External links

Emakimono
National Treasures of Japan